Donald B. Campbell is an Australian-born astronomer and Professor of Astronomy at Cornell University.  Prior to joining the Cornell faculty he was Director of the Arecibo Observatory in Puerto Rico for seven years. Campbell's research work is in the general area of planetary studies with a concentration on the radio-wavelength-scattering properties of planets, planetary satellites, and small bodies.  His work includes studies of Venus, the Moon, the Galilean satellites of Jupiter, Titan, as well as comets and asteroids. Campbell observed near-Earth asteroid 433 Eros, which was the first asteroid detected by the Arecibo Observatory radar system.

Honors and awards
 NASA Exceptional Scientific Achievement Medal (1984)
 Fellow of the American Association for the Advancement of Science (2003)
 The asteroid 4553 is named in his honor

References

External links
 Donald Campbell's web page at Cornell University
 Campbell's 2007 testimony before the U.S. House Committee on Science and Technology Subcommittee on Space and Aeronautics: "Asteroid Threat"
 Campbell's 2004 testimony before the U.S. House Committee on Science and Technology Subcommittee on Space and Aeronautics: "Lunar Science & Resources: Future Options"

Living people
21st-century Australian astronomers
Australian astrophysicists
Cornell University faculty
20th-century Australian astronomers
Planetary scientists
Year of birth missing (living people)
People associated with radar